Sundhi also known as Sodhi or Sundi or Sudi or Sudhi or Shoundika, is an Indian caste whose traditional occupation has been brewing of alcoholic drinks. According to Suratha Kumar Malik, Sundhi castes belong to the Dalit community, who are hooch traders and do small businesses. The Sundhis are included in the Other Backward Class category in the states of Bihar, Jharkhand and Odisha; and in the Scheduled Caste category in West Bengal, where they are also known as Shunri (except Saha).

References 

Indian castes
Brewing and distilling castes
Social groups of Bihar
Social groups of Jharkhand
Social groups of Odisha
Social groups of West Bengal